|}

The Quevega Mares Hurdle is a Grade 3 National Hunt hurdle race in Ireland which is open to mares aged four years or older. It is run at Punchestown Racecourse over a distance of about 2 miles and 4 furlongs (4,023 metres), and during its running there are twelve hurdles to be jumped. The race is scheduled to take place each year in February.

The race is named after the great racing mare, Quevega, trained by Willie Mullins, who won the David Nicholson Mares' Hurdle six times.  
It was first run in 2017 and had Listed status.  It was awarded Grade 3 status in 2020.

Records
Most successful jockey (2 wins):
 Ruby Walsh – Limini (2017), Laurina (2019)

Most successful trainer (5 wins): 
 Willie Mullins – Limini (2017), Meri Devie (2018), Laurina (2019), Elfile (2020), Burning Victory (2022)

Winners

See also
 List of Irish National Hunt races

References
 
Racing Post: 

National Hunt races in Ireland
National Hunt hurdle races
Punchestown Racecourse
Recurring sporting events established in 2017